The second series of Line of Duty, consisting of six episodes, premiered on 12 February 2014 on BBC Two. The series follows Superintendent Ted Hastings (Adrian Dunbar), DS Steve Arnott (Martin Compston) and DC Kate Fleming (Vicky McClure) as they lead an investigation into the corrupt actions of DI Lindsay Denton (Keeley Hawes). Additional characters include DI Matthew Cottan (Craig Parkinson) and DC Nigel Morton (Neil Morrissey). Beginning with this series, Dunbar and Parkinson are credited as main cast members in the opening credits.

Cast

Main cast 
 Keeley Hawes as DI Lindsay Denton
 Martin Compston as DS Steve Arnott
 Vicky McClure as DC Kate Fleming
 Adrian Dunbar as Superintendent Ted Hastings
 Craig Parkinson as DI Matthew "Dot" Cottan (credited with main cast in episodes in which he appears)
 Jessica Raine as DC Georgia Trotman (credited with main cast in episode in which she appears)

Supporting cast 

 Neil Morrissey as DC Nigel Morton
 Brian McCardie as Tommy Hunter
 Charlotte Spencer as Carly Kirk
 Allison McKenzie as DS Jayne Akers
 Tony Pitts as DCS Lester Hargreaves
 Christina Chong as DS Nicola Rogerson
 Mark Bonnar as DCC Mike Dryden 
 Steve Toussaint as Chief Superintendent Raymond Mallick 
 Sacha Dhawan as DS Manish Prasad 
 Henry Pettigrew as DC Jeremy Cole 
 Michael Nardone as Sergeant O'Neill
 David Maybrick as Sergeant Alex Wallis
 Antonio Magro as PC Vincent Butler
 Niall Macgregor as Richard Akers 
 Richard Huw as Nick Ronson, Evening Post journalist
 Liz White as Jo Dwyer 
 Andrea Irvine as Roisin Hastings

Episodes

Reception 
Series two received even better reviews than its predecessor,  and was ranked the best television drama of 2014 by The Observer. Alessandra Stanley of The New York Times praised the series as "original and surprising", whilst also citing an improvement on the first season, describing it as "more brutal and thrilling". Sarah Hughes of The Guardian praised the series' finale, stating "Well done to Jed Mercurio and co for a powerful, satisfying and, best of all, believable conclusion that, while quieter than the end to series one, resonated far more."

Awards 
Keeley Hawes received a Leading Actress nomination for her role as DI Lindsay Denton at the 2015 British Academy Television Awards.

Home entertainment releases 
Online
iTunes releases for Line of Duty

Blinkbox releases for Line of Duty

DVD
DVD releases for Line of Duty

Blu-ray
Blu-ray releases for Line of Duty

References

Line of Duty
2014 British television seasons
Television series about missing people